Cephisus is a genus of spittlebugs in the family Aphrophoridae.

The genus contains three species:
Cephisus jacobii Lallemand 1912
Cephisus sanguisugus Jacobi 1908
Cephisus siccifolius (Walker 1851)

References 

Aphrophoridae
Hemiptera genera